Giomar Antonio Guevara Díaz (born October 23, 1972) is a Venezuelan former professional baseball infielder. He played parts of three seasons in Major League Baseball, from 1997 through 1999, for the Seattle Mariners. Listed at 5' 8" (1.73 m), 150 lb. (68 k), Guevara was a switch-hitter and threw right-handed. He was born in Guarenas, Miranda.

Guevara [gay-vah'-rah] played for Seattle in parts of three seasons as a backup for shortstop Alex Rodriguez. He also spent 10 campaigns in the Minor leagues with the Detroit Tigers, Oakland Athletics and Mariners organizations.

In between, Guevara played winter ball with the Leones del Caracas and Tigres de Aragua clubs of the Venezuelan League between the 1993–2001 seasons.

See also
 List of Major League Baseball players from Venezuela

Sources

Retrosheet
The Baseball Gauge
Venezuela Winter League

1972 births
Appleton Foxes players
Bellingham Mariners players
Jacksonville Suns players
Lancaster JetHawks players
Leones del Caracas players
Living people
Major League Baseball players from Venezuela
Major League Baseball shortstops
Memphis Chicks players
Midland RockHounds players
Orlando Rays players
People from Guarenas
Port City Roosters players
Riverside Pilots players
Seattle Mariners players
Tacoma Rainiers players
Tigres de Aragua players
Toledo Mud Hens players
Venezuelan expatriate baseball players in the United States